Amadea is the name of several ships and boats.

  (1991), a cruise ship operated by Phoenix Reisen, formerly the Asuka
 , a  motoryacht superyacht megayacht built by Lürssen and owned by sanctioned Russian oligarch Suleyman Kerimov and seized by the U.S. government
  (19th century), a sloop stolen by pirates; see Capture of the sloop Anne
  (19th century), a slave ship captured by the British Royal Navy and condemned at Tortola in 1808

References